Blastobasis orladelaneae is a moth in the family Blastobasidae that is endemic to New Caledonia.

The forewings are greyish brown intermixed with pale greyish-brown scales and a few pale greyish-brown and white scales. The hindwings are pale greyish brown.

Etymology
The species is named in honour of Orla Pridemore Conway and Delaney Pridemore Conway.

References

Moths described in 2002
Endemic fauna of New Caledonia
Blastobasis